Ankaa is the fourth studio album by the French metal band Eths, released on 22 April 2016 via Season of Mist. It is the first full album to feature vocalist Rachel Aspe, as well as the first without second guitarist Grégory "Greg" Rouvière and Guillaume "Yom" Dupré since Yom rejoined the band in 2011 (the pair left in 2013 and 2015 respectively). For this album, Dirk Verbeuren was hired to perform drum duties despite new drummer RUL joining Eths in 2015. The album's track list and first single "Alnilam" were first announced on February 18. On 2 March they released their second song, "Nihil Sine Causa", which features additional vocals from Sarah Layssac (Arkan) and Jon Howard (Threat Signal).

Track listing

Personnel
Eths
Rachel Aspe - lead vocals
Staif Bihl - guitars, keyboards, programming, vocals, production, engineering
Damien Rivoal - bass guitar

Other personnel
Dirk Verbeuren - drums, percussion
Guillaume Dupré – additional percussion on tracks 4, 5, 8, 10, 11 and 12.
Sarah Layssac - vocals on "Sekhet Aaru" and additional vocals on tracks 1, 2, 3, 9, 10, 11 and 12.
Jon Howard - additional vocals on "Nihil Sine Causa"
Björn Strid - additional vocals on "HAR1"
Faustine Berardo - additional vocals on tracks 3, 5 and 9. 
Serge Begnis - engineering
Nelson Leeroy - mixing
Mobo - mastering
Nicolas Senegas - artwork

Charts

References

2016 albums
Eths albums